Thomas Tudor Loveday (15 August 1875 – 4 March 1966) was an English academic who was Principal of Southampton University College (1920–22) and later Vice Chancellor of the University of Bristol (1922-1944).

Early life
Loveday was born in Cropredy, Oxfordshire, the son of John Edward Taylor Loveday, a landowner, and Margaret Cheape of Scotland, the granddaughter of John Arbuthnott, 8th Viscount of Arbuthnott. His great-great-grandfather was the antiquary John Loveday. He was educated at Fettes College in Edinburgh and later attended Magdalen College, Oxford, where he obtained an MA. He won the John Locke Scholarship in 1900, and worked as an Assistant Lecturer at the University College of Bangor.

In December 1901, he was elected to a Senior Demyship in Magdalen College.

Career
He had been Professor of Philosophy at what was then the South African College in Cape Town, South Africa. He was later at Armstrong College then part of the University of Durham. He took up his position at Southampton at Easter 1920 and emphasized the importance of better buildings for the college. During his short time at Southampton two more halls of residence were built, one for men and one for women. He was Chairman of the Committee of Vice-Chancellors and Principals from 1935–1938, Chairman of the Executive Council of the Universities Bureau from 1943–45 and various other committees.

Personal life
He married Mildred Fowle (who died in 1958) and they had two daughters. He died in Williamscot, near Banbury, Oxfordshire.

See also
 List of University of Southampton people

References

External links
 
 

1875 births
1966 deaths
People educated at Fettes College
Alumni of Magdalen College, Oxford
People associated with the University of Southampton
Vice-Chancellors of the University of Bristol
English expatriates in South Africa
People from Oxfordshire